Benoît Rousseau (born 1967/1968) is a French financial analyst. He worked as financial director of Paris Saint-Germain F.C. from 1996 to 1998, and was then a financial advisor to Lille OSC, OGC Nice, AS Saint-Étienne, FC Nantes and RC Strasbourg Alsace. Formerly a president of Paris Saint-Germain, Rousseau is president of the Association Paris Saint-Germain as of April 2021.

Paris Saint-Germain 
From 1996 to 1998, Rousseau worked as a financial director for Paris Saint-Germain.

On 13 July 2011, he was named interim president of PSG by the new Qatar Sports Investments (QSi) ownership, succeeding Robin Leproux. An article in Le Parisien on 1 October said "His strength is being discreet. Most supporters have never seen his face or heard his voice. His three-month interim reign has included a historic transfer window, but no talk of him. In mid-October, he would abandon the hotseat with a sense of mission accomplished, because he is a man who "prefers to stay out of the spotlight". He was succeeded by QSi president Nasser Al-Khelaifi.

In December 2012, Rousseau became president of the Association Paris Saint-Germain.

References

Living people
Year of birth missing (living people)
French financial analysts
French football chairmen and investors
Paris Saint-Germain F.C. presidents
Paris Saint-Germain F.C. non-playing staff